Nurgöz is a village in the Aksaray District, Aksaray Province, Turkey. Its population is 457 (2021).

References

Villages in Aksaray District